Thomas Andrew Luken (July 9, 1925 – January 10, 2018) was an American politician of the Democratic Party from Ohio, serving in the United States House of Representatives during the 1970s and 1980s.

Early life and education
Luken received his high school diploma in 1942 from Purcell High School. During the Second World War, Luken served as a U.S. Marine. In 1947, he earned a Bachelor of Arts degree from Xavier University in Cincinnati, after having earned some credits at Bowling Green State University. In 1950, he earned a law degree at the Salmon P. Chase College of Law at Northern Kentucky University and began practicing law.

Career
From 1955 to 1961, Luken served as solicitor for the city of Deer Park, Ohio. He was then appointed United States District Attorney for the Southern District of Ohio, in which he served from 1961 to 1964. He served on the Cincinnati city council from 1964 to 1967 and from 1969 to 1974. He also was the mayor of Cincinnati from 1971 to 1972.

In 1974, Luken won a special election in the Cincinnati-based 1st congressional district to fill out the term of William J. Keating, a Republican who resigned his seat. However, Luken was defeated later that year in his bid for a full term by Republican Bill Gradison, who had preceded him as mayor of Cincinnati. In 1976, Luken ran in the neighboring 2nd district and unseated Republican incumbent Donald D. Clancy, beginning service in 1977 (95th Congress). He was reelected six times, all by large margins.  He was only the second Democrat to represent a significant portion of Cincinnati for more than one term in the 20th century.

In 1983, Luken and Gradison swapped districts as a result of the 1980 census, with Luken's district being renumbered as the 1st District. He did not run for an eighth term in 1990, opting instead to retire in favor of his son, Cincinnati mayor Charlie Luken, who won a term in his father's former seat.

Tom Luken's brother, Jim Luken, was a labor leader and also served as a Cincinnati mayor.

Death
Tom Luken died on January 10, 2018.

References

External links
Finding Aid for Thomas A. Luken papers, Archives and Rare Books Library, University of Cincinnati, Cincinnati, Ohio
 
 

1925 births
2018 deaths
Bowling Green State University alumni
Cincinnati City Council members
Mayors of Cincinnati
Xavier University alumni
Salmon P. Chase College of Law alumni
United States Marine Corps officers
United States Attorneys for the Southern District of Ohio
United States Marine Corps personnel of World War II
Military personnel from Cincinnati
People from Deer Park, Ohio
Democratic Party members of the United States House of Representatives from Ohio